Notre may refer to:
Notre language
André Le Nôtre

See also
Notre Dame (disambiguation)